ZED Football Club, formerly known as FC Masr, is an Egyptian professional football club based in Giza, Egypt. The club currently plays in the Egyptian Second Division, the second-highest league in the Egyptian football league system.

The club was known as FC Masr since its establishment in 2009 until 24 November 2020, when ZED Egypt acquired the club and renamed it to ZED FC prior to the start of the 2020–21 season in Egypt. They played in the Egyptian Premier League only once during the 2019–20 season under the name of FC Masr; their last season under that name.

History

2009–2014: Founding and time in lower leagues

On 1 November 2009, Egyptian football management company Masr for Football SAE announced the establishment of the club, with the aim of becoming a leading football club in Egypt concentrating on the youth system. As the 2009–10 season in Egyptian football had already started before November, the club couldn't participate in the lowest league in the Egyptian football league system and was available to enter the Egyptian Fourth Division from the next season. However, FC Masr registered for the league for the 2011–12 season, almost two years after the club was officially founded. Since the Egyptian Fourth Division is a regional league, FC Masr were placed into a group for teams from Cairo.

FC Masr enjoyed a good start to their first-ever season and were close to secure a place in the promotion play-offs, however all football related activities in Egypt were suspended (later abandoned) by the Egyptian Football Association after the Port Said Stadium riot occurred in February 2012 following a 2011–12 Egyptian Premier League match between Al Masry and Al Ahly, which resulted in the death of 74 attendants. In the following season, the club competed in the same group and again finished first, earning themselves this time an immediate promotion to the Egyptian Third Division.

In the Third Division, and similar to the lowest league, FC Masr entered a group for teams from Cairo, Giza, El Monufia and other nearby governorates. The club qualified to the next round of the league, known as the Promotion Groups where teams are divided into groups of 6 teams per group, after leading their regional group. In the Promotion Groups, they succeeded in earning promotion to the Egyptian Second Division for the first time in their history; earning back-to-back promotions from the lowest league to the second-tier league in the league system in only two years.

In November 2020, the club was renamed to ZED FC after the club was purchased by ZED Sports. The new ownership structure implemented former captain Osama Nabieh as manager.

ZED FC's academy won the "Best Academy in Africa" award at the 2021 Globe Soccer Awards. In December 2021, the club announced a partnership with English Premier League club Aston Villa (which is part-owned by ZED FC owner Onsi Sawiris' uncle Nassef Sawiris) to allow young players from their academy to play in Europe.

Kit manufacturers and shirt sponsors

Recent seasons
The recent season-by-season performance of the club:

Current squad

Managers
 Hesham Zakaria (1 August 2014 - 30 June 2015)
 Mohamed Salah - 2 Times - (22 September 2015 - 30 December 2015, 13 October 2018 - 5 August 2019)
 Ahmed El-Kass (11 December 2016 - 21 January 2017)
 Ayman El Mizzayn (1 July 2017 - 18 December 2017)
 Khaled Galal - 2 Times - (18 December 2017 - 13 April 2018, 5 February 2020 –17 September 2020)
 Osama Nabieh - 2 Times - (5 August 2019 - 6 September 2019, 1 November 2020 - 13 March 2021)
 Abdelnaser Mohamed (7 September 2019 - 5 February 2020)
 Tareq Abdullah (15 September 2020 - 1 November 2020)
 Ismail Youssef (15 March 2021 – 1 June 2022)
 Magdy Abdel Aaty (18 June 2022 – Present)

Managers Stats

References

Egyptian Second Division
Football clubs in Cairo
Football clubs in Egypt